State Route 420 (SR 420) is an unsigned primary state highway in the U.S. state of Virginia. The state highway is known as Seminary Road and Janneys Lane on its  course from Interstate 395 (I-395) east to SR 7 within the independent city of Alexandria.

Route description

SR 420 begins at a three-level diamond interchange with I-395 (Henry G. Shirley Memorial Highway). The roadway continues west as an unnumbered segment of Seminary Road that passes by the Mark Center Building, a massive office building for the United States Department of Defense, on its way to Bailey's Crossroads. SR 420, which begins as a four-lane divided highway, crosses over the northern terminus of SR 401 (Van Dorn Street) immediately to the east of the I-395 interchange. Access to SR 401 is provided via a pair of right-in/right-out intersections with Kenmore Avenue. SR 420 reduces to a four-lane undivided street that passes by Inova Alexandria Hospital, after which it again narrows to a two-lane road with a center left-turn lane. The state highway passes its namesake, the Virginia Theological Seminary, just west of its intersection with Quaker Lane, which heads north as SR 402. SR 420 continues east as Janneys Lane, a two-lane undivided street that passes to the north of the Gerald R. Ford Jr. House on its way to its eastern terminus at SR 7 (King Street).

History
SR 420 was assigned to its present location, previously unnumbered, in the mid-1980s. However, as it was once part of Fairfax County, the Seminary Road portion of SR 420 was numbered SR 716 until it was annexed by Alexandria in the 1950s.

Major intersections

References

External links

Virginia Highways Project: VA 420

420
State Route 420